Alexander Burgener (10 January 1845, Saas Fee – 8 July 1910, near the Berglihütte) was a Swiss mountain guide and the first ascentionist of many mountains and new routes in the western Alps during the silver age of alpinism. 

Together with Albert Mummery, he made the first ascent of the Zmuttgrat on the Matterhorn on 3 September 1879, and of the Grands Charmoz (1880) and the Aiguille du Grépon in the Mont Blanc Massif (5 August 1881). With another British alpinist, Clinton Thomas Dent, he made the first ascent of the Lenzspitze (August 1870) and the Grand Dru (12 September 1878), 

He was killed by an avalanche on 8 July 1910 near the Berglihütte in the Bernese Alps. Six other climbers died in the avalanche, including Burgener's son Adolf. Another son, Alexander, lost an eye in the incident.

First ascents
Lenzspitze, 1870
Portjengrat, 1871
Grand Dru, 1878
Zmutt ridge of the Matterhorn, 1879
Traverse of the Col du Lion, 1880
Grands Charmoz, 1880
Charpoua face of the Aiguille Verte, 1881
Aiguille du Grépon, 1881
Frontier ridge of Mont Maudit, 1887
Teufelsgrat of Täschhorn, 1887

Bibliography

Notes

External links

1845 births
1910 deaths
Alpine guides
Deaths in avalanches
Mountaineering deaths
Natural disaster deaths in Switzerland
Swiss mountain climbers